= The Box Set Series =

The Box Set Series is a 2014 compilation series from Legacy Recordings, including:

- The Box Set Series by John Denver
- The Box Set Series by Hall & Oates
- The Box Set Series by Sarah McLachlan
- The Box Set Series by Barry Manilow
- The Box Set Series by Willie Nelson
- The Box Set Series by REO Speedwagon
